Amritpal Singh Sandhu (born 17 January 1993) is a radical Indian Khalistan separatist, a self-styled Sikh preacher and leader of the organisation Waris Panjab De from Punjab, India. He rose to prominence in September 2022 after he returned from Dubai to India to become the leader of the organisation after the death of its previous leader Deep Sidhu in a car accident. He is currently a wanted fugitive in India. He has been reported to have close links to Pakistan's Inter-Services Intelligence and terror groups. He has also been reported to have been raising his own army and 'human bomb squads' consisting of brainwashed youth as suicide bombers.

Early life 
Not much is known about Amritpal Singh's early life. He was a resident of Jallupur Khera in the Amritsar district. In 2012, he moved to Dubai in UAE to join his family's transport business.

His LinkedIn profile claims that he has a mechanical engineering from the University of Punjab. But The Tribune reported that he had only enrolled in a diploma course at Lord Krishna Polytechnic College in Kapurthala in 2009. He soon dropped out, never having completed the course.

His profile further claimed that he was the "Operations Manager" at a company called Sandhu Cargo Transport and that he had experience in transportation, trucking and railroad industry. According to Indian Express he worked as a dispatcher for about ten years.

During the 2020–2021 Indian farmers' protest, he travelled to India to support the cause. At that time he was a Mona Sikh (Sikh without a beard and turban). After the farm laws were withdrawn, he returned to Dubai.

Waris Punjab De 
During the farmers' protest, the actor-turned-activist Deep Sidhu attempted to broaden the agenda of the agitation into fighting for the "rights of Punjab". Amritpal Singh is said to have been a vocal supporter of Sidhu and his role in the agitation. Sidhu is believed to have led a group of farmers to storm the Red Fort in Delhi on the Republic Day of 2021. He was arrested for the action and spent a few months in prison. After getting released on bail, he founded the Waris Punjab De ("Heirs of Punjab") organisation to fight for what he termed the rights of Punjab. Amritpal Singh also became a part of this organisation, remotely from Dubai. In one of his interviews, he claimed that he worked closely with Sidhu in starting the organisation.

Succession to Deep Sidhu 
After the sudden death of Deep Sidhu, a letter was published by Waris Panjab De on 4 March 2022 declaring Amritpal Singh as the organisation's leader. When Singh returned to Punjab from Dubai, an official inauguration ceremony was held on 29 September 2022 at Rode in Moga, the native village of the former Jathedar of Damdami Taksal, Jarnail Singh Bhindranwale. He took Amrit in Anandpur Sahib after being elected. His succession is disputed by some aides of Sidhu and critics claim that he was not endorsed by Sidhu's family. Sidhu's brother stated that Sidhu blocked Amritpal's phone number for fifteen days in the past and that Singh's succession to the position was illegal.

Campaigning and Prachaar
On 25 September 2022, he announced his presence in Punjab and participated in the large gathering at holy city of Anandpur Sahib. Later on, he started his first phase of Punjab tour, Khalsa Vaheer which started from Akal Takhat Sahib, Amritsar

In Sri Ganganagar, Rajasthan in October 2022, Singh's first Amrit Parchaar campaign took place, where around 647 people took Amrit (sanctified water) and became part of the Khalsa order. Next he started a 'Ghar Wapsi' (religious conversion) campaign where 927 Sikhs, Hindus and Christians in Anandpur Sahib took Amrit making headlines on newspapers, the Haryana Gurudwara Parbhandak Committee under the Haryana Government gave him support. Afterwards he held another large Amrit Parchaar campaign in Amritsar where 1,027 Sikhs and Hindus from across India took Amrit to became Khalsa Sikhs.

On 23 November, the 'Waris Punjab de' organisation started a "Khalsa Vehir" campaign.
He also organised Amrit Sanchar and anti-drug campaigns.

Khalistan and Bhindranwale styling 
Amritpal openly supports the cause of Khalistan, the separatist movement calling for a separate homeland/country for people of Sikh faith. He has given several statements in which he openly rallies for Khalistan stating, "Our aim for Khalistan shouldn't be seen as evil and taboo. It should be seen from an intellectual point of view as to what could be its geopolitical benefits. It's an ideology and ideology never dies. We are not asking for it from Delhi". He further stated in a separate instance that the Khalistan sentiment will remain in the population and that no one can suppress it. He threatened Union Home Minister Amit Shah, saying that he will meet the same fate as Indira Gandhi, who was assassinated by her Sikh bodyguards in 1984. 

Singh has stated in the past that Khalistani militant Jarnail Singh Bhindranwale is their hero. He also dresses and presents himself similar to Bhindranwale, who was killed in Operation Blue Star in 1984. This includes wearing a turban and traditional robes similar to the ones worn by Bhindranwale moving with heavily armed men around him. He also entered the Golden Temple with a group of armed men called Faujaan. His supporters also hail him as a second Bhindranwale.

Participation in violence 
In November 2022, Sudhir Suri, a Shiv Sena Politician was murdered by Sandeep Singh Sunny, who allegedly had a Waris Punjab De sticker on his vehicle. Punjab Police placed Amritpal Singh under a preemptive house arrest briefly, as a precautionary measure in anticipation of retaliatory violence against him, although he had no prior connection with Suri nor with the murder. After being released from house arrest, Singh did an Amrit Parchaar campaign in Haryana.

On 9 December 2022, Amritpal's supporters vandalised a gurudwara in Biharipura and then later on 13 December, vandalised a gurudwara in Jalandhar. They burned the chairs and sofas at these two gurudwaras claiming that one must not pray while sitting at the level of the Guru Granth Sahib at the gurudwara.

Ajnala Clash 

In February 2023, a man complained in an Ajnala police station stating he was kidnapped and beaten by the associates of Amritpal Singh. An FIR was registered against Amritpal Singh and six of his associates. The police arrested one of his close associates, Lovepreet Singh Toofan. 

After the arrest, Amritpal Singh issued an "ultimatum" to Punjab Police to revoke the case and, when the police did not respond, his supporters broke through police barricades and stormed the police complex, armed with automatic guns and sharp weapons. Several police personnel were injured and police vehicles were damaged. According to Senior Superintendent of Police Satinder Singh, the police could not retaliate because the supporters of Amritpal Singh had styled their group like a Jatha, carrying the Guru Granth Sahib.

Punjab police later released Lovepreet Singh after the court ordered his release based on the police report.

In an interview to NDTV on 25 February 2023, Amritpal alleged that the police filed a "false case" against Lovepreet. As a result, he and hundreds of Waris Punjab De supporters went to meet the police at Ajnala where Lovepreet Singh was kept. He also said that the media is misleading people about the Ajnala incident.

Crackdown by authorities

On 18 March, the Punjab Police initiated a crackdown against Waris Punjab De, arresting 78 persons and detaining several others for questioning. Amritpal Singh was reported to be absconding. Internet services in Punjab were suspended until the afternoon of 21 March, affecting 27 million people.
In the hunt to arrest Singh, the police have already set up road blocks around the region, and were already involved in a car chase with Singh, but the Waris Punjab De leader managed to escape.

Controversies
In October 2022, in one of his speeches, Amritpal said, "Jesus who could not save himself, how he will save everyone else?" which was termed hate speech by members of the Christian community. The Christian community staged a four hours-long protest against Amritpal at PAP Chowk for his remarks about Jesus Christ. The protesters demanded that an FIR should be lodged against him under 295A of the IPC (Indian Penal Code) for "hurting religious sentiments and attempting to aggravate communal divisions".

In October 2022, the president of Bharatiya Kisan Union Joginder Singh Ugrahan criticised Amritpal Singh saying, “He is just a Class XII pass out and has no experience with issues of farming and Punjab. The worst is that he is associated with a party which calls Shaheed Bhagat Singh a terrorist."

On 2 October 2022, the president of the Shiv Sena (Uddhav Thackeray), Punjab youth wing held a press conference and urged the state government to arrest Amritpal for his "seditious activities". He accused Singh of styling himself like Jarnail Singh Bhindranwale and surrounding himself with armed men. He further added that Singh doesn't preach Sikhism and rallies for secession of a Sikh state from India.

On 7 October, the Twitter account of Amritpal was withheld in India for his remarks and pro-Khalistani tweets. The Ministry of Home Affairs also instructed the state government of Punjab to remain vigilant over his activities.

With Amritpal's Facebook account already being suspended, his Instagram account was suspended on February 25, 2023. In retaliation, Amritpal supporters clashed with the police, resulting in six policemen being injured.

References

1993 births
Living people
Punjabi people
People from Amritsar district
Separatism in India
Khalistan movement
Khalistan movement people